"The Old Master Painter" is a song composed by Beasley Smith with lyrics by Haven Gillespie about a spiritual rendering of a sunset which evokes God. Published in 1949, it has since been recorded by many different artists, including Jackie Paris, Richard Hayes, Frank Sinatra, Snooky Lanson, Peggy Lee, Phil Harris and Mel Tormé.

In 1966, the Beach Boys recorded the song as "My Only Sunshine" in medley with "You Are My Sunshine" during sessions for their unfinished concept album Smile.

The recording by Peggy Lee with Mel Tormé and the Mellomen, released in 1949, can be heard on the Internet Archive

References

Sources

Songs with lyrics by Haven Gillespie
Songs written by Beasley Smith
Frank Sinatra songs
Mel Tormé songs
Peggy Lee songs
The Beach Boys songs
Brian Wilson songs
1949 songs